François de Chantelouve (François de Grossombre) was a 16th-century French poet and playwright.

A committed catholic, he wrote a tragedy on the assassination of admiral Coligny : Tragedie de feu Gaspard de Coligny (1575). He also composed a biblical tragedy, Pharaon (1577).

Bibliography 
La Tragedie de feu Gaspard de Coligny, édition  Keith Cameron, Université d'Exeter, 1971, Textes littéraires nº 3

See also 
 French Renaissance literature

External links 
 Chantelouve, Jean-François Gossombre de (15..-1581?) on Gallica
 La tragédie de feu Gaspard de Coligny [of] François de Chantelouve, Thesis (Ph. D.)--University of Texas at Austin, 1989

16th-century French poets
16th-century French dramatists and playwrights
Year of birth missing
Year of death missing